Jaime de Almeida (28 August 1920 in São Fidélis, Rio de Janeiro state, Brazil – 11 May 1973 in Lima, Peru) was a Brazilian football player and manager, who managed Flamengo on seven occasions.

References

External links
 
 

1920 births
1973 deaths
Brazilian footballers
Sportspeople from Rio de Janeiro (state)
CR Flamengo managers
Association football midfielders
Brazilian football managers
Brazil international footballers
Clube Desportivo Sete de Setembro players
CR Flamengo footballers
Clube Atlético Mineiro players
Brazilian expatriate football managers
Expatriate football managers in Peru
Club Alianza Lima managers
Peru national football team managers
People from São Fidélis